Thomas Pollan (born 1971) is a German and English language author.

He graduated from the University of Vienna, Austria, the Europa-Kolleg Hamburg, Germany, New York University and Harvard University. Since the year 2000 he has occupied various positions at the United Nations. In 2011 he published his first German language thriller "Die Strafe Gottes" with the Swiss Publisher Salis Verlag. Until then Pollan has largely been perceived as an author of  books and articles on foreign affairs and economic policies. From 2005 to 2009 he functioned as one of the authors of the World Investment Report, the flagship publication of the United Nations Conference on Trade and Development. Pollan is the speaker of "NEOS X - The 10th State", a party division of NEOS – The New Austria catering to Austrians Abroad.

Bibliography

Fiction
 Die Strafe Gottes. Thriller. Salis Verlag, Zürich 2011,

Non-fiction
 Legal Framework for the Admission of FDI. Eleven International Publishing, Den Haag 2006, .
 Globalization of R&D and developing countries. UNCTAD, Geneva 2005 (Fredriksson, Kalotay, Pollan eds.), 
 European Interests: A 2020 Vision of the Union's Foreign and Security Policy. Nomos 2004,  (in cooperation with Guido Houben)

References

External links
 Review of "Die Strafe Gottes" at relevant.at
 Author's webpage at Salis Publishing
 Pressconference with Pollan 2007
 Globalization of R&D and developing countries

1971 births
Living people
20th-century Austrian male writers
21st-century Austrian male writers
Harvard Kennedy School alumni
New York University alumni
University of Vienna alumni